The Michigan Miss Basketball award is given annually since 1981 to the person chosen as the best female high school senior basketball player in the U.S. state of Michigan by the Basketball Coaches Association of Michigan in conjunction with the Free Press.  Points are awarded on a 5-3-1 basis.  Only "actively coaching" BCAM members are permitted to vote.

Award winners

* Through 2006, girls basketball was a fall sport.  Beginning in 2007, the sport was moved to the winter with seasons beginning in one calendar year and ending in the following year.  Thus, no award was given in 2007 although the honor has been awarded annually since 1981. The 2006 award covered the 2006-2007 school year while the 2007-2008 school year was covered with the 2008 award.

See also
 Mr. Basketball of Michigan

References

Mr. and Miss Basketball awards
Awards established in 1981
Women's sports in Michigan
Basketball in Michigan
Basketball players from Michigan
Lists of people from Michigan
American women's basketball players
Michigan sports-related lists